= Tibet Everest =

Tibet Everest could be:

- Mount Everest, the Earth's highest mountain above sea level, located in the Mahalangur Himal sub-range of the Himalayas.
- Tibet Everest Resources, a public company in Tibet.
