= Tibet Everest Resources =

Chinese mining company

Tibet Everest Resources (Chinese: 西藏珠峰资源股份有限公司), also known as Tibet Summit Resources or simply Tibet Summit in English-language sources, stock abbreviation: Tibet Everest (Chinese: 西藏珠峰, SSE: 600338), is a Chinese mining company engaged primarily in non-ferrous metal and lithium resource development. It was listed on the Shanghai Stock Exchange on December 27, 2000, becoming the sixth company to be listed in the Tibet Autonomous Region.

== Corporate affairs ==
Tibet Everest Resources was initially involved in the motorcycle industry. It later pivoted to non-ferrous metallurgy in 2005 and fully shifted into upstream mining by 2015. The company is now listed on the Shanghai Stock Exchange and is a component of several indices tracking resources and new energy.

As of 2024, Tibet Everest’s largest shareholder is Shenzhen Zhongjin Lingnan Nonfemet, a Guangdong-based state-affiliated non-ferrous metals firm, with indirect ownership by Guangdong Rising Holdings Group. Other major shareholders include the China Securities Finance Corporation and the National Social Security Fund.

The company is chaired by Huang Jianrong, with Mao Yuankai serving as vice chairman and president. Tibet Everest is headquartered in Shanghai’s Jing’an District, while its registration remains in Lhasa. Its governance structure includes a board of directors and a supervisory board.

== History ==
Tibet Everest was founded on November 30, 1998, as Tibet Everest Industry Co., Ltd., promoted by Tibet Everest Motorcycle Company and regional investment entities. It was listed in 2000 on the Shanghai Stock Exchange.

In 2005, the company transitioned from motorcycles to metallurgy via a major restructuring. In 2015, it acquired 100% of Tajik-Chinese Mining Co., giving it control of a major polymetallic mine in northern Tajikistan. In 2017, it divested its smelting operations to focus exclusively on mining.

In 2018, Tibet Everest acquired lithium brine projects in Argentina’s Salta Province, including the Sal de los Ángeles (Diablillos) and Salar de Arizaro, marking its entry into the global lithium supply chain. In 2021, it announced plans to invest over USD 1.7 billion in developing these sites.

== Operations ==
Tibet Everest Resources, often referred to internationally as Tibet Summit Resources, operates across Central Asia and Latin America, with mining projects in Tajikistan and lithium development in Argentina.

=== China ===
The company no longer operates mining or smelting assets in China. Its domestic activities focus on coordination, technology R&D, and project management from Shanghai and Lhasa.

=== Tajikistan ===
Tibet Everest owns the Zarafshon lead-zinc mine through its wholly owned subsidiary Tajik-Chinese Mining Co. This mine produced over 60,000 tonnes of lead concentrate and 89,000 tonnes of zinc concentrate in 2023. The company is expanding capacity and building a metallurgical plant to refine lead, silver, and copper on site. It also plans a broader non-ferrous metals industrial park.

The Tajik operation is a major contributor to Tibet Everest's revenue and is part of China's Belt and Road Initiative. It provides employment to several thousand local workers and has signed offtake and prepayment agreements with partners such as Glencore.

=== Argentina ===
In Salta Province, Tibet Everest (operating as Tibet Summit Resources) controls two lithium brine projects:

- Sal de los Ángeles (Diablillos): Contains 2.05 million tonnes LCE. The company secured environmental approval in 2024 to construct a 30,000 t/yr lithium carbonate plant. A 10,000 t/yr module is targeted for 2025. Pilot production began in 2023 and brought in revenue of CNY 143 million. The project uses direct lithium extraction (DLE) technology, and major suppliers include Tus-Membrane and Sunresin.
- Salar de Arizaro: Still in exploration. Resource estimates suggest over 10 million tonnes LCE. Tibet Everest has conducted geophysical surveys and exploratory drilling. A pre-feasibility study is underway, and commercial production is projected for 2026 or later.

Combined, the projects may support 50,000–100,000 t/yr of lithium carbonate production. Tibet Everest has signed agreements with Argentine authorities and partners. Logistics and infrastructure work includes brine wells, freshwater sourcing, and modular equipment transported from Chile. Challenges have included environmental permitting and contractor changes.
